Alexander Banaishchik (16 March 1996, Velikiye Luki, Russia) is a Russian screenwriter and videoblogger.

Biography 

Alexander Banaishchik gained popularity as a videoblogger, screenwriter and prankster. In 2018, he moved to Moscow, where Alexander began actively working on his Instagram, he began shooting videos and writing scripts.

References

External links 
 
 Alexander Banaishchik on YouTube

Living people
1996 births